3:10 Relay was a South Korean newscast airing on JTBC in 2020. With the concept of a sports program, it puts a funny spin on domestic and foreign stories using entertaining editing and captions. It is presented by Yang Won-bo and airs weekdays at 3:10 KST. Its final episode aired on 4 December, with anchor Yang Won-bo set to take over Pyo Chang-won in Scandal Supervisor.

Segments 

 Opening – Yang Won-bo introduces the stories in Today's Headlines and ends it with showing the rating for the previous day (this has been abolished on 14 October).
 Today's Headlines – originally named Observation Point (관전 포인트), this segment is divided into three where the stories are broken down.
 Real-time Relay – the casters check the top 10 real-time trends on Naver as of broadcast time.

Commentators

Guest commentators

Ratings 
In the ratings below, the highest rating for the show will be in red, and the lowest rating for the show will be in blue each year.

Series overview

2020 

 Note that the show airs on a cable channel (pay TV), which plays part in its slower uptake and relatively small audience share when compared to programs broadcast (FTA) on public networks such as KBS, SBS, MBC or EBS.
 NR rating means "not reported". The rating is low.

Controversy 
The broadcast got backlash from netizens due to the nature of the show.

Flood in Busan 
On 24 July 2020, the show went under fire for covering the Busan flood as if a lighthearted issue. The corresponding clip was since put to private.

Beirut explosions 
The Korea Communications Commission issued a warning against the show for an 5 August 2020 segment on the Beirut explosions. Viewers were aggravated with the way the show covered about the explosions, particularly with the sports broadcasting format and the "observation points". Two days later, Yang Won-bo told audience that "we always listen to [audience] feedback and heed them." The corresponding clip was then put to private.

Bicycle stealing 
On 21 October 2020, anchor Yang Won-bo reported on an article about the Netherlands having a lot of bicycle thieves, of which he responded with a sarcastic nuance, saying he can protest at the Dutch embassy. On that same segment, he made a joke to commentator Park Sung-tae about it, saying "you experienced [having a bike stolen from you]."

Notes

References 

South Korean television news shows
JTBC original programming